Zair Isaakovich Azgur (January 15, 1908 – February 18, 1995) was a Soviet and Belarusian sculptor active during the Soviet period. Born in Mogilev Governorate (now in Vitebsk Region, Belarus), he studied in that city from 1922 to 1925; from 1925 until 1928 he studied at the Vkhutein in Leningrad. He first exhibited in 1923. He was mainly active in Minsk, where among his projects was the creation of reliefs for the opera house. He created a series of portrait busts of war heroes and military figures during the 1940s. At the 1958 World's Fair in Brussels he won a silver medal for his statue of Rabindranath Tagore. Monuments to his design were erected at Luhansk in 1947; Minsk in 1947; Borodino in 1949; Suzdal in 1950; and Leninogorsk - a monument to Vladimir Lenin - in 1957. Later in his career he exhibited in Bucharest and Paris.

Azgur's home and studio in Minsk is now a museum.

Azgur is the uncle of Jewish Belarusian partisan Masha Bruskina, publicly hanged by the Nazis in october 1941 in Minsk. Soon after the war, he immediately recognized Masha in the dreadful photographs exposed as he was visiting the Belarusian State Museum of the History of the Great Patriotic War. First claiming her identity, but then he retraced his steps.

Honours and awards
Hero of Socialist Labour
Two Orders of Lenin
Order of the October Revolution
Two Orders of the Red Banner of Labour
Order of the Red Star
Order of Friendship of Peoples
Medal "For the Victory over Germany in the Great Patriotic War 1941–1945"
Medal "For Valiant Labour in the Great Patriotic War 1941–1945"
Medal "To a Partisan of the Patriotic War" 1st class
Medal "Veteran of Labour"
Two Stalin Prizes
Title of People's Artist of the USSR (visual arts)

References

John Milner. A Dictionary of Russian and Soviet Artists, 1420 - 1970. Woodbridge, Suffolk; Antique Collectors' Club, 1993
Overview of the museum

1908 births
1995 deaths
20th-century Belarusian sculptors
People from Syanno District
People from Sennensky Uyezd
Belarusian Jews
Jews from the Russian Empire
Soviet Jews
Communist Party of the Soviet Union members
Members of the Supreme Soviet of the Byelorussian SSR (1947–1950)
Members of the Supreme Soviet of the Byelorussian SSR (1951–1954)
Members of the Supreme Soviet of the Byelorussian SSR (1955–1959)
Members of the Supreme Soviet of the Byelorussian SSR (1959–1962)
Members of the Supreme Soviet of the Byelorussian SSR (1962–1966)
Members of the Supreme Soviet of the Byelorussian SSR (1971–1974)
Members of the Supreme Soviet of the Byelorussian SSR (1975–1979)
Belarusian sculptors
Soviet sculptors
People's Artists of the Byelorussian Soviet Socialist Republic (visual arts)
Heroes of Socialist Labour
People's Artists of the USSR (visual arts)
Stalin Prize winners
Recipients of the Order of Friendship of Peoples
Recipients of the Order of Lenin
Recipients of the Order of the Red Banner of Labour
Recipients of the Order of the Red Star
Full Members of the USSR Academy of Arts
National Academy of Visual Arts and Architecture alumni
Repin Institute of Arts alumni
Jewish sculptors